FC Enerhiya Yuzhnoukrainsk was a Ukrainian football club based in Yuzhnoukrainsk, Mykolaiv oblast. The former name for the club was "Olimpiya FC AES". The club was renamed prior to the 2005–06 season.

History
The club gained its professional status in 1995 when it joined Druha Liha when it merged with FC Artania Ochakiv. The club stayed in Yuzhnoukrainsk. The club's logo implies that it has some relation to the local nuclear power plant (South Ukraine Nuclear Power Plant).

After the 2007–2008 season, the club citing lack of funds from its sponsors did not submit a license and the PFL removed the club from the Professional Ranks. The club has indicated that they will reapply to the PFL for the 2009–10 season.

Colours are yellow shirts and shorts.

League and cup history

{|class="wikitable"
|-bgcolor="#efefef"
! Season
! Div.
! Pos.
! Pl.
! W
! D
! L
! GS
! GA
! P
!Domestic Cup
!colspan=2|Europe
!Notes
|-
|-
|align=center|1995–96
|align=center|3rd "A"
|align=center|16
|align=center|40
|align=center|12
|align=center|7
|align=center|21
|align=center|34
|align=center|67
|align=center|43
|align=center|1/64 finals
|align=center|
|align=center|
|align=center|
|-
|align=center|1996–97
|align=center|3rd "B"
|align=center|12
|align=center|32
|align=center|9
|align=center|12
|align=center|11
|align=center|25
|align=center|33
|align=center|39
|align=center|1/64 finals
|align=center|
|align=center|
|align=center|
|-
|align=center|1997–98
|align=center|3rd "B"
|align=center|5
|align=center|32
|align=center|13
|align=center|6
|align=center|13
|align=center|33
|align=center|41
|align=center|45
|align=center|1/128 finals
|align=center|
|align=center|
|align=center|
|-
|align=center|1998–99
|align=center|3rd "B"
|align=center|6
|align=center|26
|align=center|11
|align=center|4
|align=center|11
|align=center|25
|align=center|31
|align=center|37
|align=center|1/128 finals
|align=center|
|align=center|
|align=center|
|-
|align=center|1999-00
|align=center|3rd "B"
|align=center|13
|align=center|26
|align=center|5
|align=center|5
|align=center|16
|align=center|19
|align=center|34
|align=center|20
|align=center|1/16 finals Second League Cup
|align=center|
|align=center|
|align=center|
|-
|align=center|2000–01
|align=center|3rd "B"
|align=center|9
|align=center|28
|align=center|10
|align=center|4
|align=center|14
|align=center|21
|align=center|33
|align=center|34
|align=center|1/8 finals Second League Cup
|align=center|
|align=center|
|align=center|
|-
|align=center|2001–02
|align=center|3rd "B"
|align=center|14
|align=center|34
|align=center|9
|align=center|11
|align=center|14
|align=center|28
|align=center|41
|align=center|38
|align=center|1st round
|align=center|
|align=center|
|align=center|
|-
|align=center|2002–03
|align=center|3rd "B"
|align=center|8
|align=center|30
|align=center|12
|align=center|4
|align=center|14
|align=center|41
|align=center|41
|align=center|40
|align=center|1/32 finals
|align=center|
|align=center|
|align=center|
|-
|align=center|2003–04
|align=center|3rd "B"
|align=center|7
|align=center|30
|align=center|12
|align=center|5
|align=center|13
|align=center|34
|align=center|41
|align=center|41
|align=center|1/32 finals
|align=center|
|align=center|
|align=center|
|-
|align=center|2004–05
|align=center|3rd "B"
|align=center|14
|align=center|26
|align=center|1
|align=center|8
|align=center|17
|align=center|7
|align=center|32
|align=center|11
|align=center|1/32 finals
|align=center|
|align=center|
|align=center|
|-
|align=center|2005–06
|align=center|3rd "B"
|align=center|12
|align=center|28
|align=center|6
|align=center|8
|align=center|14
|align=center|29
|align=center|45
|align=center|26
|align=center|1/32 finals
|align=center|
|align=center|
|align=center|Renamed
|-
|align=center|2006–07
|align=center|3rd "A"
|align=center|9
|align=center|28
|align=center|10
|align=center|7
|align=center|11
|align=center|33
|align=center|30
|align=center|37
|align=center|Did not Enter
|align=center|
|align=center|
|align=center|
|-
|align=center|2007–08
|align=center|3rd "A"
|align=center|12
|align=center|30
|align=center|7
|align=center|9
|align=center|14
|align=center|22
|align=center|47
|align=center|30
|align=center|1/64 finals
|align=center|
|align=center|
|align=center|withdrew
|}

References

 
Football clubs in Mykolaiv Oblast
Defunct football clubs in Ukraine
Association football clubs established in 1994
Association football clubs disestablished in 2008
1994 establishments in Ukraine
2008 disestablishments in Ukraine